Kristián Koštrna (born 15 December 1993) is a Slovak footballer who plays for Spartak Trnava as a right back.

Club career
He played for the Bulgarian First League side Pirin Blagoevgrad.

In January 2020, he signed a contract with Romanian Liga I club Dinamo București. He was released by Dinamo only eight months later.

International career
He played for Slovakia national team at youth level.

In October 2019 Koštrna was called to Slovakia national team for Euro 2020 qualifying match against Wales.  However, on 7 October 2019 it was announced that he will be replaced by Boris Sekulić due to an ankle injury.

Honours
Spartak Trnava
Slovak Cup: 2021–22

References

External links
 

1993 births
Living people
People from Hlohovec
Sportspeople from the Trnava Region
Slovak footballers
Slovak expatriate footballers
Slovakia youth international footballers
Association football fullbacks
Association football defenders
OFC Pirin Blagoevgrad players
FC DAC 1904 Dunajská Streda players
FC Dinamo București players
FC Spartak Trnava players
First Professional Football League (Bulgaria) players
Slovak Super Liga players
Liga I players
Slovak expatriate sportspeople in Austria
Slovak expatriate sportspeople in Bulgaria
Slovak expatriate sportspeople in Romania
Expatriate footballers in Austria
Expatriate footballers in Bulgaria
Expatriate footballers in Romania